Guilford High School (formally Guilford Senior High School) is a four-year public high school in Guilford, Connecticut.

Blackface Incident
In 2019, a Guilford High School student attended a school football game against Hartford Public Schools in blackface.

References

External links
 

Buildings and structures in Guilford, Connecticut
Schools in New Haven County, Connecticut
Public high schools in Connecticut
1886 establishments in Connecticut
Educational institutions established in 1886